Hyperolius camerunensis is a species of reed frog in the family Hyperoliidae. It is endemic to western and southwestern Cameroon.

Description
Adult males measure  and adult females  in snout–vent length.
The snout is short and obtuse. The tympanum is undifferentiated but is sometimes visible in preserved specimens. The fingers and toes bear well-developed discs. The toes are partially webbed. Individuals in "phase J" are translucent green with white dorsolateral stripes, resembling  Hyperolius bolifambae and H. riggenbachi of the same phase. The dorsum of "phase F" individuals is grey to yellow with round, red spots. The flanks are black with white specks and the venter is orange.

Habitat and conservation
It is typically found close to streams. It is likely that breeding takes place in small pools along streams. Hyperolius camerunensis is not common, but because it is an adaptable species, there are probably no significant threats to it. It is not known to occur in protected areas.

References

camerunensis
Frogs of Africa
Amphibians of Cameroon
Endemic fauna of Cameroon
Amphibians described in 2004
Taxonomy articles created by Polbot